Michael Stanley Klecheski is an American diplomat who formerly served as the United States Ambassador to Mongolia from 2019 to 2022.

Education 

Klecheski earned a Bachelor of Science in Foreign Service from Georgetown University and a Master of Arts and Master of Philosophy from Columbia University.

Career 
Klecheski served as Deputy Chief of Mission at the United States Embassy in Astana, Kazakhstan from 2013 to 2015 and in other overseas assignments in Russia, Iraq, Switzerland, and Poland.

Previous positions also included being Team Leader of the Provincial Reconstruction Team in Diwaniyah in Iraq from 2009 to 2010, and the Political Counselor for the U.S. Mission in Geneva, Switzerland in 2007 to 2009. Prior to those positions, from 2006 to 2007 he served as the Director of the National Security Council at The White House. He was also the Political Internal Unit Chief at the U.S. Embassy in Russia from 2003 to 2006 and prior to that, the Deputy Principal Officer at the U.S. Consulate in St. Petersburg, Russia 2000 from 2003. He has also held the following positions: Senior Watch Officer, Operations Center from 1999 to 2000, as Political Officer at the U.S. Embassy Manila, Philippines from 1996 to 1999 and as Political/Economic Officer at the U.S. Consulate Krakow, Poland from 1992 to 1995.  Before this, he served as a NATO Desk Officer from 1990 to 1992, and as Member of the Nuclear Risk Reduction Center from 1989 to 1990.

On August 13, 2018, President Donald Trump announced his intent to nominate Klecheski to be the next United States Ambassador to Mongolia. He was confirmed by the United States on January 2, 2019. He presented his credentials on February 22, 2019. He left this post on September 24, 2022.

Personal life 
Klecheski is from Queens, New York. He speaks Russian, Polish, French and Tagalog. He is married to Eloisa de Leon Klecheski.  They have three children.

References

Year of birth missing (living people)
Living people
People from Queens, New York
Walsh School of Foreign Service alumni
Columbia University alumni
Ambassadors of the United States to Mongolia
21st-century American diplomats